Dorogino is a rural locality (a village) in Kirillovsky Selsoviet, Ufimsky District, Bashkortostan, Russia. The population was 225 as of 2010. There are 26 streets.

Geography 
Dorogino is located 27 km northeast of Ufa (the district's administrative centre) by road. Knyazevo is the nearest rural locality.

References 

Rural localities in Ufimsky District